CarProperty.com is a website that features ads for residential and commercial properties. This website uses strong automotive components, such as homes with large garages built for car collectors, vehicle storage facilities, commercial space for automotive businesses, motor-sport facilities, parking, and garage space.

History
Car Property Group was formed in 2003 by Bob "BC" Cross, a software company owner and high-tech consultant turned real estate agent from Mountain View, California. He created CarProperty.com because he felt “the real estate system for tracking properties ignore[d] garages”. CarProperty.com launched in the Beta phase in 2007 and left Beta on June 19, 2008.

References

Real estate companies established in 2009
2009 establishments in the United States
Automotive websites
American real estate websites